Lispoides is a genus of house flies, etc. in the family Muscidae. There are about 17 described species in Lispoides.

Species
These 17 species belong to the genus Lispoides:

 Lispoides abnorminervis (Stein, 1911)
 Lispoides aequifrons (Stein, 1898)
 Lispoides argenticeps Malloch, 1934
 Lispoides argentina Malloch, 1934
 Lispoides atrisquama (Stein, 1904)
 Lispoides diluta (Stein, 1911)
 Lispoides elegantula Pont, 1972
 Lispoides gracilis (Stein, 1911)
 Lispoides guatemala Snyder, 1951
 Lispoides insularis Hennig, 1957
 Lispoides laevis (Stein, 1911)
 Lispoides latifrons Snyder, 1957
 Lispoides lopesi Albuquerque, 1955
 Lispoides nigribasis (Stein, 1911)
 Lispoides propinqua (Stein, 1911)
 Lispoides triplex (Stein, 1911)
 Lispoides uniseta Malloch, 1934

References

Further reading

 

Muscidae
Articles created by Qbugbot
Taxa named by John Russell Malloch